Chiflik may refer to:

 Chiflik, Turkish term for a system of land management in the Ottoman Empire

Places in Bulgaria
 Chiflik, Kardzhali Province
 Chiflik, Lovech Province
 Chiflik, Vidin Province
 Dolni Chiflik
 Zaim Chiflik

See also
Čiflik (disambiguation)